The 2014 Indian general election polls in Odisha for 21 Lok Sabha seats were held in two phases on 10 and 17 April 2014.

The major contenders in the state were Biju Janata Dal, Indian National Congress and Bharatiya Janata Party. The assembly elections were held simultaneously with the general elections in the state.

Opinion poll

Election schedule 

The constituency-wise election schedule is as follows.

Result

Elected members 
The results of the elections were declared on 16 May 2014.

Keys:

(1)

References

Odisha
Indian general elections in Odisha
2010s in Odisha